Benešov District is a district in the Central Bohemian Region of the Czech Republic. Its capital is the town of Beroun.

Administrative division
Benešov District is divided into three administrative districts of municipalities with extended competence: Benešov, Vlašim and Votice.

List of municipalities
Towns are marked in bold and market towns in italics:

Benešov –
Bernartice –
Bílkovice –
Blažejovice –
Borovnice –
Bukovany –
Bystřice –
Čakov –
Čechtice –
Čerčany –
Červený Újezd –
Český Šternberk –
Chářovice –
Chleby –
Chlístov –
Chlum –
Chmelná –
Chocerady –
Choratice –
Chotýšany –
Chrášťany –
Ctiboř –
Čtyřkoly –
Děkanovice –
Divišov –
Dolní Kralovice –
Drahňovice –
Dunice –
Heřmaničky –
Hradiště –
Hulice –
Hvězdonice –
Jankov –
Javorník –
Ješetice –
Jinošice –
Kamberk –
Keblov –
Kladruby –
Kondrac –
Kozmice –
Křečovice –
Krhanice –
Křivsoudov –
Krňany –
Kuňovice –
Lešany –
Libež –
Litichovice –
Loket –
Louňovice pod Blaníkem –
Lštění –
Maršovice –
Mezno –
Miličín –
Miřetice –
Mnichovice –
Mrač –
Načeradec –
Nespeky –
Netvořice –
Neustupov –
Neveklov –
Olbramovice –
Ostrov –
Ostředek –
Pavlovice –
Petroupim –
Popovice –
Poříčí nad Sázavou –
Postupice –
Pravonín –
Přestavlky u Čerčan –
Psáře –
Pyšely –
Rabyně –
Radošovice –
Rataje –
Ratměřice –
Řehenice –
Řimovice –
Sázava –
Šetějovice –
Slověnice –
Smilkov –
Snět –
Soběhrdy –
Soutice –
Stranný –
Strojetice –
Střezimíř –
Struhařov –
Studený –
Tehov –
Teplýšovice –
Tichonice –
Tisem –
Tomice –
Třebešice –
Trhový Štěpánov –
Týnec nad Sázavou –
Václavice –
Veliš –
Vlašim –
Vodslivy –
Vojkov –
Votice –
Vracovice –
Vranov –
Vrchotovy Janovice –
Všechlapy –
Vysoký Újezd –
Xaverov –
Zdislavice –
Zvěstov

Geography

A rugged and hilly landscape is typical for the district. The territory extends into three geomorphological mesoregions: Benešov Uplands (north), Vlašim Uplands (south) and Křemešník Highlands (smaller part in the east).

The area is rich in watercourses and ponds. The most important river is the Sázava, which forms the north and northeast boundary of the district before crossing it on the northwest. Other important rivers of the district area its tributaries Blanice and Želivka. Slapy and Štěchovice reservoirs, built on the Vltava River, form the western boundary of the district. The largest body of water is Švihov Reservoir, built on the Želivka. It is one of the largest reservoirs in the country.

Blaník is the only protected landscape area in the district, covering the surrounding area of the eponymous mountain.

Demographics

Most populated municipalities

Economy
The largest employers with its headquarters in Benešov District and at least 500 employers are:

Transport
The D1 motorway from Prague to Brno passes through the northern and eastern part of the district. The European route E55 separates from it, which passes across the district and continues as D3 motorway in its south.

Sights

The most important monuments in the district, protected as national cultural monuments, are:
Sázava Monastery
Konopiště Castle
Český Šternberk Castle

The best-preserved settlement, which is the only one protected as a monument zone, is Načeradec.

The most visited tourist destination is the Konopiště Castle.

References

External links

Benešov District profile on the Czech Statistical Office's website

 
Districts of the Czech Republic